Andrijana Popović (born 20 April 2002) is a Montenegrin handball player for ŽRK Budućnost Podgorica and the Montenegrin national team.

She was selected as part of the Montenegrin 35-player squad for the 2020 European Women's Handball Championship.

References

2002 births
Living people
Montenegrin female handball players
Sportspeople from Nikšić